Do sreće daleko, do Boga visoko (English translation: Happiness is Too Far Away, God is Too High Up) is the seventeenth studio album by Bosnian Serb singer Mile Kitić. It was released in 1998. This is the first album that was produced and released under the label Grand Production.

Track listing

References

1998 albums
Mile Kitić albums
Grand Production albums